An affine term structure model is a financial model that relates zero-coupon bond prices (i.e. the discount curve) to a spot rate model. It is particularly useful for deriving the yield curve – the process of determining spot rate model inputs from observable bond market data. The affine class of term structure models implies the convenient form that log bond prices are linear functions of the spot rate (and potentially additional state variables).

Background 
Start with a stochastic short rate model  with dynamics:

and a risk-free zero-coupon bond maturing at time  with price  at time . The price of a zero-coupon bond is given by:where , with  being is the bond's maturity. The expectation is taken with respect to the risk-neutral probability measure . If the bond's price has the form:

Feynman-Kac formula 
For the moment, we have not yet figured out how to explicitly compute the bond's price; however, the bond price's definition implies a link to the Feynman-Kac formula, which suggests that the bond's price may be explicitly modeled by a partial differential equation. Assuming that the bond price is a function of  latent factors leads to the PDE:where  is the covariance matrix of the latent factors where the latent factors are driven by an Ito stochastic differential equation in the risk-neutral measure:Assume a solution for the bond price of the form:The derivatives of the bond price with respect to maturity and each latent factor are:With these derivatives, the PDE may be reduced to a series of ordinary differential equations:To compute a closed-form solution requires additional specifications.

Existence 

Assuming the bond has an affine term structure and  satisfies the term structure equation, we get:

 

The boundary value 

implies

 

 

The differential equation then becomes

 

 

Then the other term must vanish as well.

 

Models with ATS

Vasicek 

The Vasicek model  has an affine term structure where

Arbitrage-Free Nelson-Siegel 
One approach to affine term structure modeling is to enforce an arbitrage-free condition on the proposed model. In a series of papers, a proposed dynamic yield curve model was developed using an arbitrage-free version of the famous Nelson-Siegel model, which the authors label AFNS. To derive the AFNS model, the authors make several assumptions:

 There are three latent factors corresponding to the level, slope, and curvature of the yield curve
 The latent factors evolve according to multivariate Ornstein-Uhlenbeck processes. The particular specifications differ based on the measure being used:
 (Real-world measure )
 (Risk-neutral measure )
 The volatility matrix  is diagonal
 The short rate is a function of the level and slope

Matching coefficients, we have the set of equations:To find a tractable solution, the authors propose that  take the form:Solving the set of coupled ODEs for the vector , and letting , we find that:Then  reproduces the standard Nelson-Siegel yield curve model. The solution for the yield adjustment factor  is more complicated, found in Appendix B of the 2007 paper, but is necessary to enforce the arbitrage-free condition.

Average expected short rate 
To find the AESR, recall that the dynamics of the latent factors under the real-world measure  are:The general solution of the multivariate Ornstein-Uhlenbeck process is:Note that  is the matrix exponential. From this solution, it is possible to explicitly compute the conditional expectation of the factors at time  as:Noting that , the general solution for the AESR may be found analytically:

References

Further reading 

Interest rates
Financial models
Fixed income analysis
Stochastic models
Short-rate models
Mathematical and quantitative methods (economics)
Mathematical finance